The list of lakes of Sweden contains the major lakes in the nation of Sweden. The great number of lakes in southern Sweden could according to Alfred Gabriel Nathorst be indebted to the creation of basins due to the stripping of an irregular mantle of weathered rock by glacier erosion.

Alphabetical list
Some of the major lakes in Sweden:

Agunnarydsjön 
Ånnsjön
Åresjön
Bolmen
Boren
Dellen
Glan
Hjälmaren
Ikesjaure
Hornavan
Mälaren
Mien
Roxen
Runn
Siljan
Sommen
Sparren
Storavan
Storsjön
Torneträsk
Tåkern
Vänern
Lake Väsman
Vättern

Largest lakes by area

Deepest lakes 
Subject to geological variations
Hornavan - 228 meters
Torneträsk - 168 m
Vojmsjön - 145 m
Stor-Blåsjön - 144 m
Stor-Rensjön - 140 m
Virihaure - 138 m
Kallsjön - 134 m
Vastenjaure - 134 m
Siljan - 134 m
Kultsjön - 130 m

Largest lakes by volume 
Lakes with the most water:
Vänern - 
Vättern - 
Torneträsk - 
Mälaren - 
Hornavan - 
Siljan - 
Storsjön - 
Kallsjön - 
Akkajaure - 
Virihaure - 
Storuman -

Water life 
 In lakes and rivers, there are a total of 52 species of fresh water fish; but several of them are rare.

See also 

Geography of Sweden
List of islands of Sweden
List of rivers of Sweden

Notes

References
 Fakta och Fiske, Fiskeriverket, 2003.
 Data from Swedish Meteorological and Hydrological Institute, 2002.

Sweden
Lakes